The superior temporal gyrus (STG) is one of three (sometimes two) gyri in the temporal lobe of the human brain, which is located laterally to the head, situated somewhat above the external ear.

The superior temporal gyrus is bounded by:
 the lateral sulcus above;
 the superior temporal sulcus (not always present or visible) below;
 an imaginary line drawn from the preoccipital notch to the lateral sulcus posteriorly.

The superior temporal gyrus contains several important structures of the brain, including:
 Brodmann areas 41 and 42, marking the location of the auditory cortex, the cortical region responsible for the sensation of sound;
 Wernicke's area, Brodmann area 22, an important region for the processing of speech so that it can be understood as language.

The superior temporal gyrus contains the auditory cortex, which is responsible for processing sounds. Specific sound frequencies map precisely onto the auditory cortex. This auditory (or tonotopic) map is similar to the homunculus map of the primary motor cortex. Some areas of the superior temporal gyrus are specialized for processing combinations of frequencies, and other areas are specialized for processing changes in amplitude or frequency. The superior temporal gyrus also includes Wernicke's area, which (in most people) is located in the left hemisphere. It is the major area involved in the comprehension of language. The superior temporal gyrus is involved in auditory processing, including language, but also has been implicated as a critical structure in social cognition.

Various parts of the STG might be referred to as anterior (aSTG), middle (mSTG), and posterior (pSTG).

Function
The superior temporal gyrus has been involved in the perception of emotions in facial stimuli.
) Furthermore, the superior temporal gyrus is an essential structure involved in auditory processing, as well as in the function of language in individuals who may have an impaired vocabulary, or are developing a sense of language. The superior temporal gyrus has been discovered to be an important structure in the pathway consisting of the amygdala and prefrontal cortex, which are all involved in social cognition processes. Including the superior temporal gyrus, areas more anterior and dorsal within the temporal lobe have been linked to the ability of processing information the many changeable characteristics of a face. Research conducted with the use of neuroimaging have found patients with schizophrenia have structural abnormalities in their superior temporal gyrus.

fMRI analysis has evidenced a link between insight based problem solving and activity in the right anterior superior-temporal gyrus, specifically in relation to the sudden flash of understanding commonly referred to as an 'Aha!' moment.

Social context
The superior temporal gyrus (STG) is important for language comprehension, but studies also suggest that it plays a functional role in the cocktail party effect. A magnetoencephalography study was conducted on participants that were exposed to five differing listening conditions each with a different level of background noise. It was discovered that the STG has a strong connection with the attended speech stream in a cocktail party setting. When the attended speech stream wasn’t disrupted by background noise a bilateral connection was displayed, but as more background noise was introduced the connection became left-hemisphere-dependent.

Additional images

References 

[1] Erin D. Bigler, Sherstin Mortensen, E. Shannon Neeley, Sally
Ozonoff, Lori Krasny, Michael Johnson, Jeffrey Lu, Sherri L. Provençal, William
McMahon & Janet E. Lainhart (2007): Superior Temporal Gyrus, Language Function,
and Autism, Developmental Neuropsychology, 31:2, 217-238

External links

 

Gyri
Temporal lobe